Codiaeum is a genus of plants under the family Euphorbiaceae first described as a genus in 1824. It is native to insular Southeast Asia, northern Australia and Papuasia.

They are shrubs with leathery leaves and often confused with the genus Croton. Some species, especially Codiaeum variegatum, are cultivated as houseplants.

Species

formerly included
moved to other genera: Austrobuxus Baloghia Blachia Fontainea Sphyranthera Trigonostemon

References

Codiaeae
Euphorbiaceae genera